Earl Russell, of Kingston Russell in the County of Dorset, is a title in the Peerage of the United Kingdom. It was created on 30 July 1861 for the prominent Liberal politician Lord John Russell. He was Home Secretary from 1835 to 1839, Foreign Secretary from 1852 to 1853 and 1859 to 1865 and Prime Minister of the United Kingdom from 1846 to 1852 and 1865 to 1866. At the same time as he was given the earldom of Russell, he was made Viscount Amberley, of Amberley in the County of Gloucester and of Ardsalla in the County of Meath. A member of the prominent Russell family, he was the third son of John Russell, 6th Duke of Bedford.

The first Earl was succeeded by his grandson the second Earl, the eldest son of John Russell, Viscount Amberley. He was one of the first peers to join the Labour Party and he held office under Prime Minister Ramsay MacDonald as Under-Secretary of State for India from 1929 to 1931. He was childless and was succeeded in 1931 by his younger brother, the third Earl, the famous philosopher and Nobel Prize winner universally known as Bertrand Russell. When he died in 1970 his eldest son, the fourth Earl held the title until his half-brother, the fifth Earl inherited it in 1987. He was a noted historian of 17th century England. Russell also sat on the Liberal Democrat benches in the House of Lords and was one of the ninety elected hereditary peers that were allowed to remain in the House of Lords after the passing of the House of Lords Act 1999.  the titles are held by his youngest son, the seventh Earl, who succeeded his brother in 2014.

As descendants of the sixth Duke of Bedford, the Earls Russell are also in remainder to that peerage and its subsidiary titles.

Earls Russell (1861)
John Russell, 1st Earl Russell (1792–1878)
John Francis Stanley Russell, 2nd Earl Russell (1865–1931)
Bertrand Arthur William Russell, 3rd Earl Russell (1872–1970)
John Conrad Russell, 4th Earl Russell (1921–1987)
Conrad Sebastian Robert Russell, 5th Earl Russell (1937–2004)
Nicholas Lyulph Russell, 6th Earl Russell (1968–2014)
John Francis Russell, 7th Earl Russell (b. 1971)

There is no-one entitled to succeed to the earldom.

Family tree

See also
Duke of Bedford (1694 creation)
Baron Ampthill
Earl of Orford (1697 creation)

Notes

References
Kidd, Charles, Williamson, David (editors). Debrett's Peerage and Baronetage (1990 edition). New York: St Martin's Press, 1990.

 
1861 establishments in the United Kingdom
Earldoms in the Peerage of the United Kingdom
 
Peerages created for the Prime Minister of the United Kingdom
Noble titles created in 1861
Noble titles created for UK MPs
History of Dorset